Kazimir (Konstantin) Kostantinovich Medunetsky (1899, Moscow - c. 1935) was a Constructivist sculptor and stage designer who was a pupil of Vladimir Tatlin and Alexander Rodchenko at Vkhutemas (Higher Art and Technical Studios) and founder member of OBMOKHU (Society of Young Russian Artists) in 1919. Medunetsky exhibited designs which included a spiral form at the 1920 OBMOKHU exhibition.

Spatial Construction (formerly Construction No. 557), 1919, in Yale University Art Gallery, is the only surviving example of Medunetsky's sculpture. It was originally purchased by Kathrine Dreier in 1922 for the Société Anonyme.

Medunetsky designed the models for the kiosks in the Soviet part of the Paris Exposition des Arts Decoratifs in 1925 and also the decorations for the Kamerny Theatre.

Aliases
Aliases used by Medunetsky included: Kazimir Konstantinovič Meduneckij; Konstantin Konstantinovič Meduneckij; Kazimir Konstantinovich Medunetsky; Konstantin Konstantinovich Medunetsky; Konstantin Konstantinowitsch Medunetzki and Konstantin Konstantinowitsch Medunezkij.

Selected works
Spatial Construction (formerly Construction No. 557), 1919. Yale University Art Gallery.
Spatial Construction, 1920.
Holiday, c. 1920.
Untitled Construction, c. 1924. (see picture, right)

References

Further reading

Katalog vystavki: Konstruktivisty K. K. Medunetskii, V. A. Stenberg, G. A. Stenberg [Catalogue of the exhibition: the Constructivists K. K. Medunetsky, V. A. Stenberg, G. A. Stenberg] (exh. cat., Moscow, Kafe Poetov, 1922).
A. Nakov: 2 Stenberg 2 (exh. cat., London, Annely Juda F.A., 1975).
C. Lodder: Russian Constructivism (New Haven, 1983).

1899 births
1935 deaths
Artists from Moscow
Russian scenic designers
20th-century Russian sculptors
20th-century Russian male artists
Russian male sculptors
Constructivism (art)